Rice Lake Township may refer to the following townships in the United States:

 Rice Lake Township, St. Louis County, Minnesota
 Rice Lake Township, North Dakota in Ward County